Sama, formerly known as Samasource, is a training-data company, focusing on annotating data for artificial intelligence algorithms. The company offers image, video and sensor data annotation and validation for machine learning algorithms in industries including automotive, navigation, augmented reality, virtual reality, biotechnology, agriculture, manufacturing, and e-commerce. Sama's mission is to expand opportunity for low-income individuals through the digital economy. One of the first organizations to engage in impact sourcing, Sama trains workers in basic computer skills and pays a local living wage for their labor.

Additionally, Sama provides health and wellness education, professional skills development, a scholarship program to assist with continuing education costs, and a program to provide micro loans and mentorship to aspiring entrepreneurs. Some of Sama's clients include Walmart, Google, General Motors and Microsoft.

Sama is headquartered in San Francisco, California, with an additional office in New York City. The organization owns and operates delivery centers in Nairobi, Kenya, Kampala, Uganda and Gulu, Uganda, and partners with additional delivery centers in India. Sama previously employed workers in Haiti, Pakistan, Ghana, and South Africa.

Business model
Sama uses a secured cloud annotation platform to manage the annotation lifecycle. This includes image upload, annotation, data sampling and QA, data delivery, and overall collaboration.

Sama's platform breaks down complex data projects from large companies into small tasks that can be completed by women and youth in developing countries with basic English skills after a few weeks of training. In Kenya, Sama offers an immersive hard and soft skill training program to help prepare underserved youth for the workplace. Sama delivery centers follow Sama's social impact guidelines, which includes hiring workers who were previously earning less than the local poverty line, paying a living wage and providing access to benefits. Sama also invests in training, salaries, and benefits for their agents, offering free or subsidized meals, transportation, healthcare, and professional development.

Sama's technology features a five-step quality assurance mechanism that gauges the success of each individual worker. Workers are not, however, in direct competition with one another as they are in crowdsourcing models. Sama's staff also makes a point of understanding the skills native to each region so that it can channel projects to centers best equipped to handle them.

First founded as a non-profit in 2008, Sama adopted a hybrid business model in 2019, becoming a for-profit business with the previous non-profit organization becoming a shareholder.

History

Entrepreneur Leila Janah founded Samasource (now Sama Group) in 2008. Janah's father sensitized her to the issue of poverty from an early age, and she became interested in global development while teaching English and creative writing in rural Ghana through a high school scholarship. Seeing her students' ambition combined with the rise in global literacy and access to technology during that time provided the initial inspiration for Samasource.

After completing a degree in African Development Studies from Harvard University, Janah worked as a consultant at Katzenbach Partners (now Booz & Company) and at the World Bank. She quickly became disillusioned, however, by the lack of insight she perceived from World Bank officials into the needs of those the organization was attempting to move out of poverty. While working with multiple clients in the outsourcing sector and nonprofit world, Janah developed the business plan for Sama.

Recognition

Sama has received numerous awards and grants, including the 2012 Secretary's Innovation Award for the Empowerment of Women and Girls and the 2012 TechFellows Award for Disruptive Innovation. The organization was also part of POPTech's 2010 Class of Social Innovation Fellows. Fast Company named Sama as "One of the Most Innovative Companies of 2015", saying that Sama is "defining what it means to be a not-for-profit business". Sama has also been profiled in TechCrunch, Wired, and Business Insider among other publications.

Janah, was included in Conde Nast's Daring 25 list in 2016 and as one of "Five Visionary Tech Entrepreneurs Who Are Changing the World" by The New York Times Style Magazine  in 2015. She was also named a "Rising Star" on Forbes' 30 Under 30 list in 2011, one of the 50 people who will change the world by Wired, and one of the 100 most creative people in business by Fast Company. She is the recipient of a 2011 World Technology Award, a Social Enterprise Alliance Award, and a Club de Madrid award. Janah died in 2020, at age 37. 

Sama Wins 2023 Business Intelligence Group Innovation Award

Controversy 
Sama is currently facing a lawsuit in Kenya over alleged unsafe and unfair working conditions when the company fails to comply with 12 labor claims presented to it. Nzili and Sumbi Advocates, the law firm representing Daniel Motaung, a former Sama employee who was fired for organizing a strike over poor working conditions and pay in 2019, accused the subcontractor of violating various rights, including the right to health and privacy of Kenyan and international employees. Motaung was allegedly fired for organizing the strike and trying to unionize Sama's employees. The law firm has given Meta and Sama 21 days (from Tuesday, March 29) to respond to the claims or face legal action.

The threatened lawsuit follows a Time report detailing how Sama recruited the moderators under the false pretense that they would take jobs at call centers. According to the report, the moderators, who were recruited from all parts of the continent, only learned about the nature of their work after signing employment contracts and moving to the center in Nairobi. The moderators sift through social media posts on all platforms, including Facebook, to remove those that spread and perpetuate hate, misinformation and violence.

In a post published after the revelation, Sama denied any wrongdoing and said the company is transparent in its hiring practices and maintains a culture that "prioritizes the health and well-being of employees".

It was revealed by a Time investigation that in order to build a safety system against toxic content (e.g. sexual abuse, violence, racism, sexism, etc...) in e.g. ChatGPT, OpenAI used Sama's services to outsource labeling toxic content to Kenyan workers earning less than $2 per hour. These labels were used to train a model to detect such content in the future. The outsourced laborers were exposed to such toxic and dangerous content that they described the experience as "torture".

References

Information and communication technologies for development
Human-based computation
Social enterprises
Companies based in San Francisco
Technology companies established in 2008
2008 establishments in California